Edie is a feminine given name, as well as a surname.

Edie may also refer to:

 Edie (film), a 2017 British drama film
 Edie, Pennsylvania, United States, a census-designated place
 "Edie (Ciao Baby)", a 1989 song by the Cult on their album Sonic Temple

See also
Eddie (disambiguation)
Edy (disambiguation)